Hualinsi Buddhist Temple Station is a station of Guangzhou Metro Line 8, located underground on the intersection of Middle Kangwang Road, Changshou West Road, Liwan District, Guangzhou, Guangdong Province, China.  The station was opened on November 26, 2020, with the opening of the northern extension of Guangzhou Metro Line 8.

Station layout
The station has an underground island platform. Platform 1 is for trains towards Jiaoxin, whilst platform 2 is for trains towards Wanshengwei.

In order not to affect the ground traffic of Middle Kangwang Road as much as possible during the construction of this station, and to avoid the Kangwang Road tunnel south of the station, the platform was constructed using a combination of cut and cover excavation, and the width of the central open cut part was 26 meters wide, the most spacious platform in Guangzhou Metro. In addition, the two main tracks of Line 8 need to match the direction of Kangwang Road, so both platforms 1 and 2 are curved.

Exits
There are 5 exits, lettered B, C1, C2, D, and E. Exit C2 is accessible. Exit B is located on Changshou East Road, exit C1 is located on Middle Kangwang Road, exits C2 and D are located on Changshou West Road, and exit E is located on Xiajou Road.

Gallery

References

Railway stations in China opened in 2020
Guangzhou Metro stations in Liwan District